The flag of Kuala Lumpur, Malaysia was officially adopted on 14 May 1990 to commemorate the Dewan Bandaraya Kuala Lumpur (DBKL) or Kuala Lumpur City Hall's 100 years as the local authority of Kuala Lumpur. The flag was designed as a variant to Jalur Gemilang, the Flag of Malaysia, incorporating design elements with its own identity as one of the Federal Territories of the nation. The flag is flown annually on the first day of February, commemorating the day when Kuala Lumpur became a Federal Territory on 1 February 1974.

History
The flag designer was Azmi Ahmad Termizi, a DBKL architect and planner who was among the team assigned to design a flag to commemorate 100 years of DBKL's role as the local authority of Kuala Lumpur. Submitting fifteen designs to the management, four of them were shortlisted and presented to Prime Minister Mahathir Mohamad for approval. On the night of 14 May 1990, a symbolic ceremony was held where the new flag was received from the Yang di-Pertuan Agong Sultan Azlan Shah by the Lord Mayor (Datuk Bandar) of Kuala Lumpur Tan Sri Elyas Omar. The flag has been in official use since then.

Design
Azmi's design incorporates elements of the national flag into the flag of Kuala Lumpur. The flag is a blue field with seven equal horizontal alternating stripes of red and white on upper and lower length of the flag, charged with a yellow crescent moon facing, towards the fly, a yellow 14-pointed star.

According to the Malaysian Ministry of Information website, each design symbolises a particular identity. The red symbolises the city's courage and strength, the blue for the unity of its multiracial citizens, the yellow for sovereignty, and the white for cleanliness and beauty.

Usage

The Minardi PS02 livery displays the Kuala Lumpur flag.

References

1990 establishments in Malaysia
Kuala Lumpur
Kuala Lumpur
Culture of Kuala Lumpur
History of Kuala Lumpur
Kuala Lumpur